Antonio Ruiz Cervilla (born 31 July 1937) is a Spanish retired football midfielder and manager.

Playing career
Born in Guadalupe de Maciascoque, Region of Murcia, Ruiz played five years for Real Madrid, making his La Liga debut on 21 April 1957 in a 4–1 home win against Celta de Vigo. He appeared in only 15 games in his first three seasons combined, adding five complete matches in the club's 1958–59 campaign in the European Cup, including the 2–0 final win against Stade de Reims.

In 1962, Ruiz signed for Deportivo de La Coruña on loan, being an undisputed starter during his only season but suffering relegation. Released by the Merengues, he spent five of the following seven seasons in Segunda División, one of the two exceptions being 1964–65 with Real Murcia – top level relegation. He retired in 1970 at the age of 33, with Spanish first division totals of 103 games and five goals.

Manager career
Immediately after retiring, Ruiz started coaching, his first stop being Murcia's B-team. In the following three decades he managed another eight clubs, interspersed with several periods of inactivity.

From 1979 to 1981, Ruiz was in charge of UD Las Palmas in the top flight, being sacked early into his second season, which ended in a narrow escape from relegation. In 1984–85 and 1994–95, in the same division, he amassed 30 games for Elche CF and CD Logroñés combined as both teams eventually dropped down a level; the La Rioja side had no fewer than five coaches throughout the campaign, finishing with an all-time low 13 points.

Honours

Real Madrid
La Liga: 1956–57, 1957–58, 1960–61, 1961–62
Copa del Generalísimo: 1961–62; Runner-up 1958, 1959–60, 1960–61
European Cup: 1956–57, 1957–58, 1958–59, 1959–60; Runner-up 1961–62
Intercontinental Cup: 1960
Latin Cup: 1956

References

External links

1937 births
Living people
Footballers from Murcia
Spanish footballers
Association football midfielders
La Liga players
Segunda División players
Tercera División players
Real Madrid CF players
Deportivo de La Coruña players
CD Málaga footballers
Real Murcia players
CD Castellón footballers
Spain under-21 international footballers
Spanish football managers
La Liga managers
Segunda División managers
Real Madrid Castilla managers
UD Las Palmas managers
Granada CF managers
Rayo Vallecano managers
Elche CF managers
Real Oviedo managers
CD Eldense managers
CD Logroñés managers
CD Guadalajara (Spain) managers
UEFA Champions League winning players